is a Japanese football player for Fujieda MYFC.

Club statistics
Updated to 23 February 2016.

References

External links

Profile at Fujieda MYFC

1993 births
Living people
University of Tokyo alumni
Association football people from Tokyo
Japanese footballers
J3 League players
Fujieda MYFC players
Association football midfielders